Montverde is a town in Lake County, Florida, United States. The population was 1,655 at the 2020 census and an estimated 1,675 in 2018. It is part of the Orlando–Kissimmee–Sanford Metropolitan Statistical Area.

History

Montverde was the location of a Native American settlement and burial ground. The earliest record of American settlement is from 1865. Initially named "West Lake Apopka", the site took the name "Monte Verde" from a settler from Vermont who remarked on its rolling green hills while arriving at the site by boat on Lake Apopka. The town of Montverde was incorporated on May 18, 1925.

The central feature of the town is Montverde Academy, a private preparatory school for primary and secondary students. The school was opened in 1912.

Geography

Demographics

At the 2000 census there were 882 people, 351 households, and 272 families living in the town. The racial makeup of the town was 96.49% White, 1.59% African American, 0.23% Native American, 0.45% Asian, 0.11% from other races, and 1.13% from two or more races. Hispanic or Latino of any race were 2.61%.

Of the 351 households 27.6% had children under the age of 18 living with them, 66.4% were married couples living together, 8.5% had a female householder with no husband present, and 22.5% were non-families. 19.7% of households were one person and 5.7% were one person aged 65 or older. The average household size was 2.51 and the average family size was 2.89.

The age distribution was 22.3% under the age of 18, 6.8% from 18 to 24, 29.9% from 25 to 44, 27.0% from 45 to 64, and 13.9% 65 or older. The median age was 41 years. For every 100 females, there were 97.3 males. For every 100 females age 18 and over, there were 94.6 males.

The median household income was $45,341 and the median family income  was $46,813. Males had a median income of $35,774 versus $26,944 for females. The per capita income for the town was $20,504. About 4.5% of families and 5.3% of the population were below the poverty line, including 7.1% of those under age 18 and 12.0% of those age 65 or over.

Notable people

 Ben Simmons, basketball player Philadelphia 76ers, attended Montverde Academy from 2013–2015, as did current Miami Heat forward Precious Achiuwa from 2018–2019. 2021 number 1 pick in the NBA draft, Cade Cunningham, also attended Montverde Academy from 2018–2020

References

Towns in Lake County, Florida
Greater Orlando
Towns in Florida